The 1979 Boston College Eagles football team represented Boston College as an independent during the 1979 NCAA Division I-A football season. In its second season under head coach Ed Chlebek, the team compiled a 5–6 record, scored 215 points, and allowed 215 points. On September 22, the team's 34-7 victory over Villanova ended a 16-game losing streak dating back to the 1977 season.

The team's statistical leaders included Jay Palazola with 747 passing yards, Dan Conway with 856 rushing yards, and Rob Rikard with 603 receiving yards. 

The team played its home games at Alumni Stadium in Chestnut Hill, Massachusetts.

Schedule

Roster

References

Boston College
Boston College Eagles football seasons
Boston College Eagles football
Boston College Eagles football